Myštice is a municipality and village in Strakonice District in the South Bohemian Region of the Czech Republic. It has about 300 inhabitants.

Administrative parts
Villages of Kožlí, Laciná, Střížovice, Svobodka, Vahlovice and Výšice are administrative parts of Myštice.

References

Villages in Strakonice District